The Henry Williams House is a historic home located in Halesite on the border with Huntington in Suffolk County, New York. It was built about 1850 and is a -story, three-bay residence with a 1-story, four-bay west wing.  The house is representative of the American Picturesque-style.

It was listed on the National Register of Historic Places in 1985.

References

Houses on the National Register of Historic Places in New York (state)
Houses completed in the 19th century
Houses in Suffolk County, New York
National Register of Historic Places in Suffolk County, New York